Rory O'Donnell (1575 – 30 July 1608), younger brother of Hugh Roe O'Donnell, was the last King of Tyrconnell and 1st Earl of Tyrconnell.

Early life
O'Donnell was one of nine known children of Sir Hugh O'Donnell, who reigned from 1566 until he abdicated in favour of his eldest son by his second wife, Hugh Roe O'Donnell, in 1592. By this point the sons of his first wife had been disabled or killed, mostly by his Scottish-born second wife, the Inion Dubh.

After the defeat at Kinsale in December 1601, Rory became acting chief when his older brother left to seek help from Spain. He led the clan back to Connaught and maintained guerilla warfare until December 1602, when he submitted to Lord Deputy Mountjoy at Athlone.

Head of the clan O'Donnell
In 1602, O'Donnell succeeded his recently deceased brother Hugh as King of Tyrconnell and head of the clan O'Donnell. Having submitted in London to the new King, James I, he was created Earl of Tyrconnell per letters patent of 4 September 1603, with the subsidiary title Baron of Donegal reserved for his heir apparent. He was further granted the territorial Lordship of Tyrconnell per letters patent of 10 February 1604.

Flight of the Earls

There was much fury in Ireland and England that he and Hugh O'Neill, 2nd Earl of Tyrone had been treated so gingerly after allegedly committing treason (this became known as the Sham Plot), but time was on the side of the English authorities. On 14 September 1607, both Earls set sail from Lough Swilly with their families and followers for eventual exile in Spanish Flanders and Rome. Tyrconnell died in Rome in 1608.

Family
O'Donnell married Bridget, daughter of Henry FitzGerald, 12th Earl of Kildare, by whom he had two children: Hugh and Mary. After his death, Bridget married Nicholas Barnewall, 1st Viscount Barnewall (1592–1663) with whom she had five sons and four daughters that survived him.

O'Donnell's only son, Hugh, was three weeks shy of his first birthday when the Earls sailed from Lough Swilly, and was raised in Louvain, Spanish Flanders. In time he joined the service of the King of Spain, and was killed in action when his ship engaged a French vessel in August or September 1642 and caught fire. He succeeded his father as 2nd Earl of Tyrconnell, but left no offspring; the title of Earl would have descended to his first cousin Domhnall Oge's line were it not meanwhile attainted in 1614.

O'Donnell's youngest child, Mary Stuart O'Donnell, left a more lasting impression on posterity. Born in England in 1608. After her father's death, King James I of England, the first Stuart King of England, who was James VI of Scotland gave her the name Stuart, in recognition of their common Stuart ancestry – they were ninth cousins – hence she was known as Mary Stuart O'Donnell. She was descended, through her mother, Bridget née Fitzgerald, from the Stuarts. She was raised by her mother in Kildare lands in Ireland until she was twelve years old. In 1619 Mary was sent to live with her grandmother, Lady Kildare in London, where Lady Kildare aimed to educate the girl and make her her heiress. Her mother Bridget meanwhile remarried and had a further nine children.

Family tree

Notes

References

 
Wealth of Dignity, Poverty of Destiny – The Destitution of a Catholic Princess for her Devotion (The tragic story of Mary, Princess of Tyrconnell, Rory's daughter), by Francis Martin O'Donnell, Knight of Malta, in pages 3–6 of O'Domhnaill Abu, the O'Donnell Clann Newsletter no. 32, published by V. O'Donnell, Inver, County Donegal, Summer 2004 [ISSN 0790-7389].
History of Killeen Castle, by Mary Rose Carty, published by Carty/Lynch, Dunsany, County Meath, Ireland, April 1991 – page 18 refers to Elizabeth O'Donnell as 1st Countess of Fingall.
Calendar of State Papers – 1603-4 – James I (item 123, pages 79–80), National Library of Ireland, Dublin.
Red Hugh O Donnell's sisters, Siobhan and Nuala, Paul Walsh, in Irish Leaders and Learning, ed. O'Muraile, Dublin, 2003, pp. 326–29.
http://www.araltas.com/features/odonnell/

Further reading

1575 births
1608 deaths
Flight of the Earls
Kings of Tír Chonaill
People of Elizabethan Ireland
16th-century Irish monarchs
17th-century Irish monarchs
Wild Geese (soldiers)
Irish soldiers in the Nine Years' War
Rory
Irish people of Scottish descent
Burials at San Pietro in Montorio
People of the Nine Years' War (Ireland)
Earls of Tyrconnell
Peers of Ireland created by James I
Irish chiefs of the name